Symmetric form may refer to:

Symmetric bilinear form
Symmetric sesquilinear form